CarLingo is an online car shopping company. The company is best known for its online shopping platform, which makes recommendations based on a consumer's attitude and budget. CarLingo was founded in November 2014 by Steve Greenfield, Mark Conlin, Josh Searcy and Chris Tranchina. The company's chief executive officer is Steve Greenfield.

In December 2014, the company started its Resource Center to help car shopping customers with vehicle selection, price negotiation, the trade appraisal, monthly payment and dealership selection. CarLingo received first place at the 2015 Atlanta TechCrunch Meetup.

References

Further reading
CEO explains CarLingo

Online automotive companies of the United States
Retail companies established in 2014
Internet properties established in 2014